Richard Gibbs (born c. 1945) was a Canadian and American football player who played for the Hamilton Tiger-Cats. He won the Grey Cup with them in 1967. He previously played college football at the University of Iowa (winning letters in 1965 and 1966) and lived in Chariton, Iowa. He was selected in the 1967 NFL draft by the San Francisco Giants in Round 13.

References

1940s births
Hamilton Tiger-Cats players
Living people
Iowa Hawkeyes football players
Sportspeople from Oak Park, Illinois
People from Chariton, Iowa
American football halfbacks
Canadian football running backs
Players of American football from Illinois